The Osella PA2 is a 2-liter Group 5 (Sports 2000) prototype racing car built by Osella, to compete in the World Sportscar Championship sports car racing series from 1974 to 1975, but was used in active competition IMSA GT Championship until the end of 1985. It was initially powered by either the  Abarth twin-cam engine, or later, the BMW M12/7 Turbo engine.

References 

Abarth vehicles
BMW vehicles
Osella vehicles
Mid-engined cars